The 1886 St. Louis Browns season was the team's fifth season in St. Louis, Missouri, and the fifth season in the American Association. The Browns went 93–46 during the season and finished first in the American Association, winning their second pennant in a row.  In the World Series the Browns played the National League champion Chicago White Stockings, winning the series 4 games to 2.  This was the only win by the AA in seven postseason contests with the NL from 1884 to 1890.

Regular season

Season standings

Record vs. opponents

Roster

Player stats

Batting

Starters by position 
Note: Pos = Position; G = Games played; AB = At bats; H = Hits; Avg. = Batting average; HR = Home runs; RBI = Runs batted in

Other batters 
Note: G = Games played; AB = At bats; H = Hits; Avg. = Batting average; HR = Home runs; RBI = Runs batted in

Pitching

Starting pitchers 
Note: G = Games pitched; IP = Innings pitched; W = Wins; L = Losses; ERA = Earned run average; SO = Strikeouts

References 
1886 St. Louis Browns at Baseball Reference
1886 St. Louis Browns team page at www.baseball-almanac.com

St. Louis Cardinals seasons
Saint Louis Browns season
St. Louis Browns